Hypostomus wuchereri is a species of catfish in the family Loricariidae. It is native to South America, where it occurs in the Paraguaçu River basin in Brazil. The species reaches 35 cm (13.8 inches) in total length and is believed to be a facultative air-breather.

References 

wuchereri
Fish described in 1864
Catfish of South America
Taxa named by Albert Günther